Alopaeus (sometimes transliterated as Alopeus) is the name of a Finnish noble family, originating from Vyborg. Some family members have fennicized the name to Kettunen or Tuomas-Kettunen. Members of the family played an important political and ecclesiastical role in the history of Russia, Finland and Sweden. Some of them held the tile of Baron and Count in Russia.

Notable members 
 Johan Alopaeus (1731–1811), ennobled in 1772 with the name Nordensvan
 Baron Maximilian von Alopeus (1748–1822), Russian diplomat
 Count Frans David Alopaeus (1769–1831), his brother, also a diplomat
 Count Fredrik Alopaeus (1810–1862), Finnish general in the Imperial Russian Army, younger son of David 
 Maunu Jaakko Alopaeus, Bishop of Porvoo 1809–1818
 Carl Henrik Alopaeus, Bishop of Porvoo 1885–1892 
 Erik Alopaeus, first Finnish Parliamentary Ombudsman in 1920 
 Marianne Alopaeus (born 1918), Finnish author

See also 

Swedish-speaking Finns

References 

Finnish noble families
Finnish families
Swedish noble families
Latin-language surnames